The Merchants National Bank Building, previously known as the "First Alabama Bank Building" and more recently the "Regions Bank Building" is a high-rise in the US City of Mobile, Alabama. Completed in 1929, the building rises  and 18 stories. Upon its completion, the Merchants National Bank Building became the tallest building in Mobile, the seventh-tallest building in the state of Alabama, and the tallest skyscraper in the state outside Birmingham. The building remained the tallest in the city until the completion of the RSA–BankTrust Building in 1965. The Merchants National Bank Building now stands as the 6th-tallest building in Mobile.

The Merchants National Bank Building, designed by Chicago-based architectural firm Graham, Anderson, Probst & White, is an example of Art Deco architecture.

On August 1, 2017, it was announced the building will undergo a major renovation into a $30 million 82 unit apartment complex.

See also
List of tallest buildings in Mobile

References

Skyscraper office buildings in Mobile, Alabama
Office buildings completed in 1929
Art Deco architecture in Alabama
Bank buildings in Alabama
1929 establishments in Alabama